Marek Wleciałowski (born 31 January 1970) is a Polish football manager and former player.

References

1970 births
Living people
Polish footballers
Association football midfielders
Ruch Chorzów players
Ekstraklasa players
I liga players
Polish football managers
Górnik Zabrze managers
Ruch Chorzów managers
Piast Gliwice managers
Sportspeople from Chorzów